The 2013–14 Temple Owls basketball team represented Temple University during the 2013–14 NCAA Division I men's basketball season. The Owls, led by eighth year head coach Fran Dunphy, played home games at the Liacouras Center. This was their inaugural season in the American Athletic Conference. They finished the season 9–22, 4–14 in AAC play to finish in a tie for eighth place. They lost in the first round of the AAC tournament to UCF.

Roster

Schedule and results

|-
!colspan=9 style="background:#9E1B34; color:#FFFFFF;"| Regular season

|-
!colspan=9 style="background:#9E1B34; color:#FFFFFF;"| American Athletic Conference tournament

References

Temple Owls men's basketball seasons
Temple
Temple
Temple